Gunner Berg (22 November 1764 – 19 August 1827) was a Norwegian priest, writer and politician.

He was born in Stjørdalen. He finished his secondary education in Throndhjem in 1782, and graduated with the cand.theol. degree in 1786. He was hired as a vicar in Lenviken in 1792. In 1881 he was promoted to dean of Senjen prosti, after one year he became vicar in Ibestad. He was known for his historical and topographical writings, which have been used as sources by later historians.

He was elected to the Norwegian Parliament in 1818, representing the constituency of Finmarkens Amt (Troms county did not exist until 1866). However, he never got the chance to actually meet in Parliament, due to illness. His replacement was Hans Christoffer Klæboe. Berg died in August 1827.

References

1764 births
1827 deaths
Norwegian priest-politicians
Norwegian writers
Members of the Storting
Troms politicians
People from Stjørdal